Yarr may refer to:

 Tommy Yarr (1910–1941), American football player
 Yarr Radio
 Yarr, a character in W.I.T.C.H., an Italian comic series
 Youngstown and Austintown Railroad
Spergula arvensis, sometimes referred to in New Zealand as yarr

See also
 Yar (disambiguation)
 International Talk Like a Pirate Day